The Bavarian C II was a class of early German steam locomotives operated by the Royal Bavarian State Railways (Königlich Bayerische Staatsbahn).

Articulated variant (Stütztender) 

The first C IIs were built experimentally as articulated locomotives. The concept was based on an idea that had been developed by Wilhelm von Engerth (c.f. the Engerth locomotive), whereby the boiler barrel was supported by the tender - sometimes called a Stütztender or 'supported tender'. Because the engines did not ride smoothly however, they were converted in 1870. Initially the Stütztender was removed and, in order to balance out the uneven weight distribution on the axles, the first axle was uncoupled, so that the locomotives had a 1B axle arrangement. When, after a few years, the boiler had to be replaced, it was positioned further forward to enable a better distribution of weight. As a result, the former articulated locomotives were then the same as the standard C II locomotives and became six-coupled again. A total of five were built by Maffei, which were named HERCULES, HECTOR, ACHILLES, AJAX and THESEUS.

Standard variant 

The C II locomotives were needed to handle the growth in goods traffic. The standard variant of the C II series was built as an 0-6-0 engine with a 4-wheeled tender. It was derived from the Bavarian C I class and was given an external locomotive frame, horizontal outside cylinders, an internal Stephenson valve gear and a 'long-necked crank' (Langhalskurbel). The transition from boiler barrel to outer firebox had been tapered so that it could fit between the rear axle. Instead of a driver's cab, these locos were given a weather shield (Wetterschirm), similar to those on present-day motorbikes. Their retirement began in 1891 and was complete by the end of the 1920s. Several examples went as wartime reparations to France and Belgium.

They were equipped with a Bavarian 2 T 9,25 tender.

See also
 List of Bavarian locomotives and railbuses

References

 
 

0-6-6 locomotives
C II
Standard gauge locomotives of Germany
Maffei locomotives
Krauss locomotives
Railway locomotives introduced in 1857
Freight locomotives